Closer than Close is the fourth album by American singer Rosie Gaines, released on June 13, 1995. The album's title track was remixed and released as a single in 1997, reaching number four on the UK Singles Chart. "I Want U" was also released as a single, reaching number 70 in the UK. Prince provides backing vocals on the track "My Tender Heart".

Track listing
All tracks composed by Rosie Gaines, Francis Jules and Dana Bailey; except where indicated
American edition
 "I Want U (Inner City Blue)" (Earth Mama Version)  (Prince, Rosie Gaines) – 6:34
 "Are You Ready" – 5:49
 "Closer than Close" – 5:09
 "Googaga" – 3:55
 "Turn Your Lights Down Low" (Bob Marley) – 4:29
 "My Tender Heart" (Prince, Rosie Gaines) – 5:10
 "I Almost Lost You" – 2:37
 "Slowman" – 5:33
 "Can You Handle It" – 5:13
 "Concrete Jungle" (Bob Marley) – 7:48
 "Get the Ghetto off Your Mind" – 5:52
 "December 25th" – 3:56
 "I Want U" (Purple Version) – 3:36

Notes: Tracks 4-7 and 11 are reworked versions from the then-unreleased album Concrete Jungle.

International version
 "I Want U" (Purple Version) – 3:36
 "Are You Ready" – 5:49
 "Closer than Close" – 5:09
 "Googaga" – 3:55
 "Ooh La La" - 4:41
 "Turn Your Lights Down Low" - 4:29
 "My Tender Heart" - 5:10
 "I Almost Lost You" - 2:37
 "Slowman" - 5:33
 "Can You Handle It" - :13
 "Concrete Jungle" - 7:48
 "Get the Ghetto off Your Mind" - 5:52
 "December 25" - 3:56
 "Bubbly World" (bonus track) - 5:05
 "Do What U Wanna Do" (bonus track) - 3:11

References

1995 albums
Rosie Gaines albums
Motown albums